Ambatoboeny is a town in north-western Madagascar in Boeny Region.

Populated places in Boeny